Methoxyresveratrol may refer to:

 3-Methoxyresveratrol (pinostilbene)
 4-Methoxyresveratrol